Tongling Prison is a prison in Tongling, Anhui, China. It was established in 1998.

See also
List of prisons in Anhui

References
Laogai Research Foundation Handbook

Prisons in Anhui
1998 establishments in China
Tongling